The following is a list of churches in the City of Carlisle.

Map of medieval parish churches
For the purposes of this map medieval is taken to be pre-1485. It is of note that Cumbria, unlike most parts of England, saw a sustained programme of church building during the 16th and 17th centuries as the more remote parts of the district were settled.

List

Active churches
The district has an estimated 98 churches for 108,400 inhabitants, a ratio of one church to every 1,106 people.

The following civil parishes have no active churches: Askerton, Carlatton, Kingmoor, Midgeholme, Solport and Upper Denton.

Defunct churches

References

 
Churches
Carlisle
Churches